Jenny LeClue: Detectivú is an adventure game developed and published by Mografi. It was released for iOS (as a launch title for Apple Arcade), Microsoft Windows, macOS, and Linux in September 2019, and will be released for PlayStation 4 at a later date. The Spoken Secrets Edition added full voice acting as a free update on July 24, 2020. The game was released for Nintendo Switch on August 25, 2020.

Gameplay

The choices that players make throughout the game have an impact. The game contains point-and-click elements, and features a hand-drawn art style. Players are able to interact with most items in the game. During dialogue sections, players can observe the person talking to spot clues as to whether they are lying. Locations that players explore include mines, graveyards, mountains, police stations, and libraries.

Plot
Author Arthur K. Finklestein is the creator of the Jenny LeClue series of books, a classic children's sleuth series whose sales are dwindling as readers begin to find the stories trite and boring.  His publisher demands a darker, grittier Jenny LeClue book or else the series will be canceled, so Finklestein reluctantly responds by giving Jenny her biggest case yet: the murder of the beloved dean of local Gumboldt College, with her forensic science professor mother as the prime suspect.  Within the narrative, Jenny must clear her mom's name and repair her fractured relationship with the dean's son, while Finklestein struggles to commit to putting his beloved Jenny and her town of Arthurton through the wringer in order to keep the series alive.

Development
The game had a successful crowdfunding campaign. With a goal of $65,000, it reached $105,797 by August 2014. It was released for iOS, Microsoft Windows, macOS, and Linux on September 19, 2019, it was released for Nintendo Switch on August 25, 2020 and will be released for PlayStation 4 later in the near future. For the iOS version, it was released on the Apple Arcade service.

References

External links
 

2019 video games
Apple Arcade games
Crowdfunded video games
Detective video games
Indie video games
IOS games
Kickstarter-funded video games
Linux games
MacOS games
Nintendo Switch games
PlayStation 4 games
Point-and-click adventure games
Video games featuring female protagonists
Windows games